Euriphene obtusangula, the banded nymph, is a butterfly in the family Nymphalidae. It is found in eastern Nigeria and Cameroon. The habitat consists of forests.

References

Butterflies described in 1912
Euriphene